Mpanga is a location on River Mpanga in Kitagwenda county, Kitagwenda District in  Western Uganda.

Location
Mpanga is located in Kitagwenda District, in the Western Region of Uganda, adjacent to where River Mpanga empties into Lake George. Mpanga is also the location of Mpanga Power Station, an 18 megawatt hydropower project in Uganda, constructed between 2008 and 2011. Mpanga Power Station was commissioned on 10 February 2011.

Landmarks
The landmarks at or near Mpanga include:

 Mpanga Power Station - An 18 MW hydroelectric power plant across River Mpanga
 Lake George - An inland crater lake that lies entirely in Uganda within Queen Elizabeth National Park
 Mpanga Forest - A National Forest Reserve
 Queen Elizabeth National Park (QENP) - Lying within neighboring Kasese District and Rubirizi District, QENP is the most visited national park in Uganda.

See also
 Empire of kitara
 Toro sub-region
 Kitagwenda District
 Western Region, Uganda

References

External links
 Potential Hydropower Projects in Uganda
 Location of Mpanga At Google Maps

Populated places in Western Region, Uganda
Kitagwenda District